Medina College-Ipil is a private, non-sectarian higher education institution in Ipil, Zamboanga Sibugay. It was established by Dr. Rico Macan Medina, Sr. and his wife Dr. Beatriz Crisostomo Medina in June 2001, two years after its sister school in Pagadian was founded. The school offers Commission on Higher Education (CHED) recognized programs in Midwifery, Nursing, Pharmacy, Computer Science, Criminology, Elementary Education, Hotel and Restaurant Management. Much like its sister schools in Ozamiz, Pagadian, and Misamis Occidental, Medina College-Ipil is among the private schools in its local.

The institution also offers Technical and Vocational Education and Training (TVET) programs under the Technical Education and Skills Development Authority (TESDA) and CHED.

History
The birth of Medina College-Ipil dates back in June 2001, 38 years after Dr. Rico Macan Medina, Sr. and his wife, Dr. Beatriz Crisostomo Medina have founded the first Medina College in Ozamiz City (1963), province of Misamis Occidental (1983), and Pagadian City (1999).

References

Education in Ozamiz
Universities and colleges in Zamboanga Sibugay